The men's 50 kilometre cross-country skiing competition at the 1972 Winter Olympics in Sapporo, Japan, was held on Thursday 10 February at Makomanai Cross Country Events Site. Kalevi Oikarainen of Finland was the 1970 World champion and Ole Ellefsæter of Norway was the defending champion from the 1968 Olympics in Grenoble, France.

Each skier started at half a minute intervals, skiing the entire 50 kilometre course. Of the 40 athletes who started the race, seven did not finish. Pål Tyldum of Norway took his third medal of the Games; his first individual Olympic gold medal.

Results
Sources:

References

External links
 Final results (International Ski Federation)

Men's cross-country skiing at the 1972 Winter Olympics
Men's 50 kilometre cross-country skiing at the Winter Olympics